Live from Madison Square Garden is a live album by O.A.R. released on June 5, 2007.  The album was recorded at Madison Square Garden in New York City on January 27, 2007.  The concert was also released at the same time as a full length DVD, and on Blu-ray Disc on November 25, 2008.  Included with the DVD and Blu-ray packages is a feature film titled Behind the Backlines.

Track listing
Disc One
 "Love and Memories" - 5:13
 "Untitled" - 5:59
 "Hey Girl" - 9:21
 "Risen" - 4:30
 "Living in the End" - 4:54
 "About Mr. Brown" - 6:03
 "Heard the World" - 5:28
 "About an Hour Ago" - 7:02
 "One Shot" - 5:08
 "James" - 6:02
 "Anyway" - 9:30
Disc Two
 "Dareh Meyod" - 4:53
 "Something Coming Over" - 4:53
 "Black Rock" - 8:57
 "Lay Down" - 6:09
 "That Was a Crazy Game of Poker" - 17:20
 "52-50" - 10:36
 "City on Down" - 7:21

References

O.A.R. albums
2007 live albums
Albums recorded at Madison Square Garden